Obsidian is the second studio album by American electronic musician Baths, released on May 28, 2013 by Anticon. The album was preceded by the single "Miasma Sky" released on March 6, 2013.

Obsidian received generally positive acclaim from critics and gained a title of "best new music" by Pitchfork. It also peaked at number fifteen and sixteen on Billboard'''s Top Dance/Electronic Albums and Heatseekers Albums respectively.

 Background 
Will Wiesenfield started work on some tracks of Obsidian before his debut album Cerulean. During touring and promotion of his first album, he became seriously ill with a serious case of E. coli.  Wiesenfield said he "got really sad and sort of felt this momentum to try and make this darker record". He commented that behind the music, "there’s a very distorted, raw state of mind" and explained that  "it's this dichotomy. It's pop music, but it’s tragic and dark.”

Critical receptionObsidian received positive reviews from contemporary music critics. At Metacritic, which assigns a normalized rating out of 100 to reviews from mainstream critics, the album received an average score of 76, based on 22 reviews, which indicates "generally favorable reviews". Ian Cohen of Pitchfork praised the album saying "the gregarious and genial Wiesenfeld has created a more subversive work by getting uncomfortably close to pop." Vincent Pollard rated the album 9 out of 10, while writing in his review that "Obsidian is a gorgeous suite of electronic pop songs that will draw you in and stay with you for days on end." Slant Magazine described the music on the album as IDM. PopMatters's Robin Smith stated that Obsidian is a "self-sufficient synth-pop record in the vein of the Postal Service’s Give Up, ploughing through its songs and laying his beats as paths for stories."

Track listing

Charts

 Personnel 
Credits adapted from the liner notes of Obsidian''.

Musicians
 Will Wiesenfield – performance
 Ryan Satoru Studer – cello
 Luke Silas – drums 
 Amir Yaghmai – violin 
 Andy Studer – violin 
 Emily Call – violin 
 Georgi Dimitrov – violin

Technical personnel
 Mario Luna – engineering
 Daddy Kev – mastering

Artwork
 Folder – design, typography
 Alex Takacs – art direction

References

External links
 

2013 albums
Anticon albums
Baths (musician) albums